Dongchang Road is a station on Shanghai Metro Line 2. It is part of the initial  to  section of Line 2 that opened on 20 September 1999.

References

Line 2, Shanghai Metro
Shanghai Metro stations in Pudong
Railway stations in China opened in 1999
Railway stations in Shanghai